The European Superstock 600 Championship was a support class to the Superbike World Championship at the European rounds. The championship used 600 cc production motorcycles and was reserved for riders between 15 and 24 years of age. Same rules as FIM Superstock 1000 Cup applied, but the series was organized by FIM Europe. In November 2015 the championship was discontinued as a result of the creation of a new European sub-series to be held within the Supersport World Championship and changes in the Supersport technical regulations.

Champions

References

External links 

 
Motorcycle road racing series